Wakhan, is a very mountainous and rugged part of the Pamir and Karakoram regions of Afghanistan.

Wakhan may also refer to:

 Wakhan Corridor
 Wakhan River
 Wakhan District